Craig Vaughan (born 13 January 1964) is a South African diver. He competed in the men's 3 metre springboard event at the 1992 Summer Olympics.

References

External links
 

1964 births
Living people
South African male divers
Olympic divers of South Africa
Divers at the 1992 Summer Olympics
Place of birth missing (living people)